Gregovce is a small village on the right bank of the Sotla River in the Municipality of Brežice in eastern Slovenia, on the border with Croatia. The area is part of the traditional region of Styria. It is now included in the Lower Sava Statistical Region.

References

External links
Gregovce on Geopedia

Populated places in the Municipality of Brežice